Queen of Angels or Our Lady of the Angels (Regina Angelorum) is a devotional title of Mary, mother of Jesus. It may refer to:

Devotions 
 , first celebrated in 1635, the patron saint of Costa Rica

Buildings and institutions

Churches 
 Our Lady of Angels, a 16th-century Franciscan monastery in Orebić, Croatia
 Basilica of Our Lady of the Angels, Cartago (built 1639), a Catholic basilica in Costa Rica
 Our Lady Queen of Angels Church, a historic Catholic church built in 1814 in Los Angeles, California, United States
 Our Lady of Angels Church, Karaikal a.k.a. Karaikal Church (built 1822), a Catholic church in Pondicherry, India
 Our Lady of the Angels, Nuneaton (built 1838), a Catholic church in the United Kingdom
 Queen of Angels Church, Newark (1854-2016), New Jersey, United States
 Our Lady of Angels Church, Puducherry (built 1855), a Catholic church in Puducherry, India
 Our Lady of the Angels and St Peter in Chains Church, Stoke-on-Trent (built 1857), a Catholic church in the United Kingdom
 Church of Our Lady Queen of Angels (New York City) (1886-2007), New York, United States
 Our Lady of the Angels Catholic Church (Jacksonville, Florida) (1925-2002), in the United States
 Queen of Angels Church, Kadagathur (built 1932), Tamil Nadu, India
 Our Lady of the Angels Church, Erith (built 1963), a Catholic church in the United Kingdom
 Our Lady of the Angels Monastery, Virginia (dedicated in 1989), a Trappistine monastery near Crozet, Virginia, United States
 Our Lady of the Angels Monastery (consecrated in 1999), a Catholic monastery in Hanceville, Alabama, United States
 Cathedral of Our Lady of the Angels a.k.a. the Los Angeles Cathedral or COLA (dedicated in 2002), a mother church in Los Angeles, California, United States
 Our Lady Queen of Angels Catholic Church (Kula, Hawaii), United States
 Queen of Angels Catholic Church (Fort Wayne, Indiana), United States

Hospitals 
 Queen of Angels - Hollywood Presbyterian Medical Center (est. 1924), a hospital in Los Angeles, California, United States
 Queen of Angels Hospital (1926-1989), a hospital in Los Angeles, California, United States

Education 
 Our Lady of the Angels School (Albuquerque, New Mexico), built 1878, in the United States
 Our Lady Queen of Angels Catholic Elementary School (New York City), est. 1892, in New York, United States
 Our Lady of the Angels School (Illinois), built 1903, a Catholic elementary school in Chicago, United States, known for a fatal fire in 1958
 Our Lady of the Angels Academy (est. 1911), a Catholic school in Belle Prairie Township, Minnesota, United States
 Our Lady Queen of Angels Seminary (OLQA, 1953-1995), a Catholic minor seminary in Los Angeles, California, United States
 Queen of Angels Academy (Compton, California) (1995-2001), a private Catholic high school for girls in the United States

Other 
 Queen of Angels Foundation (est. 2011), an American association of lay faithful of the Catholic Church

Art and entertainment 
 Queen of the Angels (painting), a 1900 oil painting by French artist William-Adolphe Bouguereau, exhibited at the Petit Palais, Paris, France
 Music for Our Lady Queen of the Angels, a 1980 album by Canadian multi-instrumentalist Garth Hudson
 Queen of Angels (novel), a 1990 science fiction novel by Greg Bear

See also
 Coronation of the Virgin, pre-Middle Age figurative representation of the Marian title of Queen of Angels
 St. Mary of the Angels (disambiguation)
 Basilica of Our Lady of the Angels (disambiguation)